"See You..." is the seventh single by melody. under the Toy's Factory label released February 15, 2006. It was produced by Taku Takahashi of M-Flo. The single stayed on the Oricon for 5 weeks and peaked at number 19. To date, the single has sold 13,070 copies.

Track listing
 See You... (4:26)
 Close You Eyes (5:08)
 See You... (Mel Funk Remix) (4:12)
 Realize (Sugiurumn House Mission Mix) (6:34)

2005 songs
2006 singles
Melody (Japanese singer) songs
Toy's Factory singles
Songs written by Taku Takahashi